Estonia competed at the 2022 Winter Paralympics in Beijing, China which took place between 4–13 March 2022.

Competitors
The following is the list of number of competitors participating at the Games per sport/discipline.

Wheelchair curling

Estonia competed in wheelchair curling.

Summary

Round robin

Draw 4
Sunday, March 6, 14:35

Draw 5
Sunday, March 6, 19:35

Draw 6
Monday, March 7, 9:35

Draw 7
Monday, March 7, 14:35

Draw 9
Tuesday, March 8, 9:35

Draw 10
Tuesday, March 8, 14:35

Draw 12
Wednesday, March 9, 9:35

Draw 14
Wednesday, March 9, 19:35

Draw 16
Thursday, March 10, 14:35

Draw 17
Thursday, March 10, 19:35

See also
Estonia at the Paralympics
Estonia at the 2022 Winter Olympics

References

Nations at the 2022 Winter Paralympics
2022
Winter Paralympics